is a Japanese festival celebrated from July 31 to August 4 in Hachinohe, Aomori Prefecture, Japan. There is a procession of twenty-seven floats and three mikoshi are also borne through the streets. It has a two hundred and ninety-year history and in 2004 was designated an Important Intangible Folk Cultural Property.

On August 2 the Chojasan Shinra Shrine holds the annual tournament. It is the traditional Kagami-style dakyu and is held only in Hachinohe, Yamagata Prefecture, and the Imperial Household Agency.

See also
List of festivals in Aomori Prefecture
List of Important Intangible Folk Cultural Properties
Important Intangible Cultural Properties of Japan
Dakyu

References

External links

 Hachinohe Sansha Taisai homepage

Festivals in Aomori Prefecture
Important Intangible Folk Cultural Properties
Hachinohe